Melnikovo is a rural locality (a selo) and the administrative center of Melnikovsky Selsoviet, Novichikhinsky District, Altai Krai, Russia. The population was 947 as of 2013. There are 10 streets.

Geography 
Melnikovo is located 19 km west of Novichikha (the district's administrative centre) by road. Novichikha is the nearest rural locality.

References 

Rural localities in Novichikhinsky District